Following are the results of the 2007 GDF Suez Grand Prix doubles tennis competition.  The 2007 Gaz de France Budapest Grand Prix was a WTA Tour tennis event held on April 21–29, 2007, won by Gisela Dulko.

Janette Husárová and Michaëlla Krajicek were the defending champions, but both chose not to participate that year.

Seeds

 Maria Kirilenko Elena Likhovtseva (semifinals)
 Eleni Daniilidou Jasmin Wöhr (semifinals)
 Lucie Hradecká Renata Voráčová (first round)
 Ágnes Szávay Vladimíra Uhlířová (champions)

Draw

Draw

References

External links
Draws

Budapest Grand Prix
Budapest Grand Prix
Budapest Grand Prix